The Amilcar CGS Grand Sport was a popular inter war lightweight sports car, manufactured by the French automobile maker Amilcar between 1923 and 1925. A response to the successful Salmson VAL3 series, the "C Grand Sport" was developed from the Amilcar C. The CGS had a longer, more rigid chassis, and improved brakes in addition to its bigger engine.

Its 1,074cc, 30 bhp, side valve engine with an aluminium head gave it a listed top speed of at least , and could be tuned for better performance. Four-wheel brakes were fitted.

A lowered and higher tuned version, the CGSS, the second S standing for surbaisse (lowered), was also made. Around 4,700 of both types were made.

Racing History

24 Hours of Le Mans

1924 
A single CGS was entered as a works car at the 1924 24 Hours of Le Mans. The car did not finish due to a problem with its oil tank.

1925 
A single CGS was entered as a works car at the 1925 24 Hours of Le Mans. French race car driver Marius Mestivier had a fatal accident in the evening which resulted in the car not finishing.

References 

conceptcarz.com Amilcar CGS-3

Amilcar vehicles
Cars introduced in 1923